The Campeonato Catarinense de Futebol, known as Campeonato Catarinense or simply Catarinense, is the main competition of association football from state of Santa Catarina, in Brazil.

History
The Campeonato Catarinense top level has had several different names since it started. From its first edition, in 1924, to 1985, it was called just Campeonato Catarinense (Santa Catarina Championship). From 1986 to 2003, it was named Campeonato Catarinense Primeira Divisão (Santa Catarina Championship Premier Division). In 2004 and in 2005, the competition name was Série A1, and since 2006, the competition is named Divisão Principal (Top Division).

Format

First stage
 All ten teams play a round-robin playing once against each other team.
 The top 4 teams qualify for the semi-finals which are played 1st vs 4th and 2nd vs 3rd. Where games are tied the higher placed team progresses. The final is played at the ground of the higher placed team and, as in the semi-final, in a tied game the higher placed team wins.

Second stage
 All ten teams play a round-robin playing once against each other team.
 The top 4 teams qualify for the semi-finals which are played 1st vs 4th and 2nd vs 3rd. Where games are tied the higher placed team progresses. The final is played at the ground of the higher placed team and, as in the semi-final, in a tied game the higher placed team wins.

Finals:
 Home-and-away playoffs between the winners of the first and second stages.

The winner of the Finals is crowned champion.

Clubs

 Avaí 
 Chapecoense 
 Criciúma 
 Figueirense
 Guarani de Palhoça 
 Inter de Lages
 Brusque
 Joinville 
 Marcílio Dias
 Metropolitano

Results

Titles by Team 

 Teams in italic are not currently active in professional football.

Titles by City

Participation

Most appearances

Below is the list of clubs that have more appearances in the Campeonato Catarinense.

External links
 FCF Official Website

 
Catarinense